Vitor Mendes Alves (born 13 February 1999), known as Vitor Mendes, is a Brazilian footballer who plays as a central defender for Fluminense, on loan from Atlético Mineiro.

Club career
Born in Belém, Pará, Mendes joined Santos' youth setup in 2016, from Inter de Limeira. On 18 August 2017, he signed his first professional contract until 2022, but was loaned to Atlético Mineiro in 2018, after appearing rarely.

In December 2019, Galo activated the R$ 400,000 buyout clause on his contract, and Mendes signed a permanent contract with the club. The following 4 February, however, he joined Guarani on loan, but returned to his parent club in May after making no appearances.

On 20 July 2020, Mendes was loaned to Série C side Boa Esporte until May 2021. He made his senior debut six days later, coming on as a second-half substitute for Wesley in a 1–0 Campeonato Mineiro away win against Patrocinense.

On 21 October 2020, Mendes joined Figueirense on loan for the remainder of the 2020 Série B season. The following 8 February, he moved to Juventude, recently promoted to the Série A, also in a temporary deal.

Career statistics

Honours
Atlético Mineiro
Supercopa do Brasil: 2022
Campeonato Mineiro: 2022

References

External links

1999 births
Living people
Sportspeople from Belém
Brazilian footballers
Association football defenders
Campeonato Brasileiro Série A players
Campeonato Brasileiro Série B players
Campeonato Brasileiro Série C players
Clube Atlético Mineiro players
Guarani FC players
Boa Esporte Clube players
Figueirense FC players
Esporte Clube Juventude players
Fluminense FC players